Mickaël Rouch is a French rugby league footballer who represented France national rugby league team in the 2017 World Cup.

Rouch began his career at Limoux Grizzlies, having a spell with Saint-Esteve XIII Catalan before returning to Limoux. He was selected as part of the France squad for the 2017 Rugby League World Cup and made his French debut against Australia on 3 November 2017.

References

External links
2017 RLWC profile

1993 births
Living people
AS Saint Estève players
France national rugby league team players
French rugby league players
Limoux Grizzlies players
Rugby league locks